Oren Spencer Burks (born March 21, 1995) is an American football linebacker for the San Francisco 49ers of the National Football League (NFL). He played college football at Vanderbilt and was drafted by the Green Bay Packers in the third round of the 2018 NFL Draft.

High school
Burks attended South County High School in Lorton, Virginia. Rated as a 3-star prospect out of high school, Burks committed to Vanderbilt over other offers from Duke, Maryland, Boston College, and others.

College career
In a game against Kentucky during his second year, Burks intercepted 2 passes, one of which was returned for a touchdown.  This feat caused him to become the SEC defensive player of the week. Following his senior season, Burks was also invited to play in the 2018 Senior Bowl as an alternate.

Professional career

Green Bay Packers
The Green Bay Packers selected Burks in the third round (88th overall) of the 2018 NFL Draft. The Green Bay Packers traded their fourth (101st overall) and fifth round (147th overall) picks in 2018 to the Carolina Panthers in exchange for the Panthers' third round pick which they used to select Burks. Burks was the 12th linebacker drafted in 2018.

On May 17, 2018, the Green Bay Packers signed Burks to a four-year, $3.43 million contract that includes a signing bonus of $820,756.

Burks entered training camp slated as a backup inside linebacker. He competed against Antonio Morrison to be a starting inside linebacker after Jake Ryan sustained a torn ACL during training camp. Burks sustained a shoulder injury during pre-game warmups before the start of the Packers' third preseason game at the Oakland Raiders and was subsequently inactive for the first two regular season games (Weeks 1–2). Head coach Mike McCarthy named Burks a backup starting inside linebacker, behind Antonio Morrison, upon his return from injury. On September 23, 2018, Burks made his professional regular season debut and recorded two combined tackles during a 31–17 loss at the Washington Redskins in Week 3.

San Francisco 49ers
On March 17, 2022, Burks signed a two-year contract with the San Francisco 49ers.

NFL career statistics

Regular season

Postseason

References

External links
San Francisco 49ers bio
Vanderbilt Commodores bio

1995 births
Living people
People from Fairfax Station, Virginia
Players of American football from Virginia
Sportspeople from Fairfax County, Virginia
American football safeties
American football linebackers
Vanderbilt Commodores football players
Green Bay Packers players
San Francisco 49ers players
Sportspeople from Alexandria, Virginia